Jerald D. Slack (born February 14, 1936) is a retired major general in the United States Air National Guard and former Adjutant General of Wisconsin.

Biography
Slack graduated high school in Pekin, Illinois. Later he would attend Purdue University, the University of Illinois at Urbana-Champaign, and Bradley University.

Career
Slack originally enlisted in the Illinois Air National Guard in 1959. He would transfer to the Wisconsin Air National Guard in 1961 and was commissioned a second lieutenant. Slack would acquire more than 3,200 hours flying in a Cessna T-37 Tweet, Lockheed T-33 Shooting Star, Northrop F-89 Scorpion, Convair F-102 Delta Dagger, Cessna O-2 Skymaster, Cessna A-37 Dragonfly, Fairchild Republic A-10 Thunderbolt II, and the Boeing KC-135 Stratotanker. He was promoted to Major General of August 3, 1990 and his retirement was effective as of February 13, 1996, The day before his 60th birthday.

Awards he has received include the Legion of Merit, the Meritorious Service Medal, the Air Force Commendation Medal, the Army Commendation Medal, the Air Force Achievement Medal, the Air Force Outstanding Unit Award with oak leaf cluster, the Air Force Organizational Excellence Award, the Combat Readiness Medal, the National Defense Service Medal with service star, the Air Force Longevity Service Award with silver oak leaf cluster and two bronze oak leaf clusters, the Armed Forces Reserve Medal with two hourglass devices, the Small Arms Expert Marksmanship Ribbon with service star, and the Air Force Training Ribbon.

References

Military personnel from Wisconsin
Adjutants General of Wisconsin
United States Air Force generals
Recipients of the Legion of Merit
Purdue University alumni
University of Illinois Urbana-Champaign alumni
Bradley University alumni
Living people
People from Pekin, Illinois
1936 births
Military personnel from Illinois